Joshua Boyle may refer to:

 Joshua Boyle,  kidnapped in Afghanistan; see kidnapping of Joshua Boyle and Caitlan Coleman
 Joshua Boyle (politician), member of parliament in the Irish House of Commons, 1641